Briggs Lake is an unincorporated community in Palmer Township, Sherburne County, Minnesota, United States, near Clear Lake.

References

Unincorporated communities in Sherburne County, Minnesota
Unincorporated communities in Minnesota